The 2020–21 Norwich City F.C. season was the club's 119th season in existence and the first season back in the second tier of English football. In addition to the domestic league, Norwich City participated in this season's editions of the FA Cup and the EFL Cup.

Players

First-team squad

Transfers

Transfers in

Loans in

Loans out

Transfers out

Notes

Pre-season and friendlies

Norwich City confirmed they would play Milton Keynes Dons, SC Verl, Dynamo Dresden and Darmstadt 98 during pre-season.

Competitions

Overview

EFL Championship

League table

Results summary

Results by matchday

Matches
The league fixtures were announced on 21 August 2020.

FA Cup

The third round draw was made on 30 November, with Premier League and EFL Championship clubs all entering the competition. The fourth and fifth rounds draws were made consecutively on 11 January.

EFL Cup

The first round draw was made on 18 August, live on Sky Sports, by Paul Merson.

Statistics

Appearances, goals and cards

Goalscorers

Notes

References

External links

Norwich City F.C. seasons
Norwich City